Algimantas Bražinskas (Born in Vilkaviškis; 12 November 1937 – 29 January 2020) was a Lithuanian composer.

Recordings
 Five Cuckoo Ballads (For A Capella Mixed Choir) 1985

References
 

1937 births
2020 deaths
Lithuanian composers
People from Vilkaviškis